József Pongrácz (10 September 1891 – March 1959) was a Hungarian wrestler. He competed in the featherweight event at the 1912 Summer Olympics.

References

External links
 

1891 births
1959 deaths
Olympic wrestlers of Hungary
Wrestlers at the 1912 Summer Olympics
Hungarian male sport wrestlers
Sportspeople from Szeged